Ramkvilla is a small village south of Vetlanda in the southern Swedish province of Småland. Ramkvilla is situated by the lake Örken.

References 

Populated places in Jönköping County